McNeill v. United States, 563 U.S. 816 (2011), was a decision by the Supreme Court of the United States holding that, regarding whether an offense under State law is a serious drug offense for purposes of federal sentencing, courts must consult the maximum term of imprisonment for the offense at the time of conviction.

Background
The plaintiff, Clifton Terelle McNeil, was sentenced to 300 months in jail after being convicted of unlawful possession of a firearm. He was also sentenced to an additional 240 months in prison for unlawful possession with intent to distribute crack cocaine. A US District court determined McNeil was an "armed career criminal" and therefore sought the highest sentence possible for his crimes. McNeil argued that he was not eligible for maximum sentencing because his drug related charges were not "serious drug offenses under the ACCA."

Question before the Court
Can the federal Armed Career Criminal Act be used in conduction with a state law for the purposes of a longer sentence?

Decision of the Supreme Court
In a unanimous decision in favor of the United States, Justice Thomas wrote the opinion for the Court. Thomas noted that, "A federal sentencing court must determine whether 'an offense under State law' is a 'serious drug offense' by consulting the 'maximum term of imprisonment' applicable to a defendant's prior state drug offense at the time of the defendant's conviction for that offense."

Notes

See also 
 List of United States Supreme Court cases, volume 563

References

External links
 

2011 in United States case law
United States Supreme Court cases
United States Supreme Court cases of the Roberts Court
United States controlled substances case law
Armed Career Criminal Act case law